Dreaming Grand Avenue is a 2020 American fantasy drama film directed by Hugh Schulze, starring Jackson Rathbone, Andrea Londo, Wendy Robie and Tony Fitzpatrick.

Cast
 Jackson Rathbone as Jimmy
 Andrea Londo as Maggie
 Wendy Robie as Andromeda
 Tony Fitzpatrick as Jack Yancy
 Tiffany Bedwell as Dr. Emily Wandervogel
 Bryce Gangel as Amy
 Tony Castillo as Ernesto
 Troy West as Walt Whitman
 Abby Pierce as Audra

Release
The film premiered at the ChiTown Movies Drive-in on 23 September 2020.

Reception
Richard Roeper of Chicago Sun-Times rated the film 3.5 stars out of 4 called the film a "small but ambitious and metaphysical and deeply poetic gem with big ideas, stunningly original visuals of Chicago — and beautifully honed performances from a cast that includes talented young actors and some veteran performers who bring a grounded, real-world, seen-it-all wisdom to their respective and somewhat mystical roles." Dann Gire of the Daily Herald rated the film 3 stars out of 4 and wrote that the film "skirts across genres with the reliable grace of an el train hitting every station stop on its way through Chicago."

Peter Martin of ScreenAnarchy praised the performances of Rathbone and Londo, writing that they "avoid overdramatizing their roles" and portray their characters in an " empathetic light". He also praised the characters they portray as being "likeable". Robert Daniels of RogerEbert.com rated the film 2 stars out of 4 and praised the performances of Rathbone and Londo, writing that they "avoid overdramatizing their roles" and wrote that the film "stumbles to an unearned finish" and contains several "unnecessary" ingredients to a "narrative concoction brimming to overflow."

References

External links
 
 

American fantasy drama films
2020s fantasy drama films